CinePlayer is a software based media player used to review Digital Cinema Packages (DCP) without the need for a digital cinema server by Doremi Labs. CinePlayer can play back any DCP, not just those created by Doremi Mastering products. In addition to playing DCPs, CinePlayer can also playback JPEG2000 image sequences and many popular multimedia file types.

There are two versions of CinePlayer available, standard and Pro. The standard version supports playback of non-encrypted, 2D DCP's up to 2K resolution. The Pro version supports playback of encrypted, 2D or 3D DCP's with subtitles up to 4K resolution.

Supported formats

Containers

 AVI
 MOV
 MXF
 MPG
 TS
 WMV
 M2TS
 MTS
 MP4
 MKV

Video codecs

 JPEG2000
 ProRes 422
 DNxHD®
 YUV Uncompressed 8-10 bits
 DIVX®
 XVID®
 MPEG4
 AVC / H-264
 VC-1
 MPEG2

Supported image sequences

 BMP
 TIFF
 TGA
 DPX
 JPG
 J2C

Supported audio files

 WAV
 MP3
 WMA
 MP2

See also 
 Doremi Labs
 CineAsset
 CineExport
 Comparison of DCP creation tools
 Non-linear video editing
 List of video editing software
 Comparison of video editing software

Notes

External links 
 CinePlayer: Product page
 CinePlayer: User Manual
 Download CinePlayer (evaluation version)
 Doremi Labs website

Video editing software
Film and video technology
Dolby Laboratories